The fifth season of the American television series The Masked Singer premiered on Fox on March 10, 2021, and concluded on May 26, 2021. The season was won by singer Nick Lachey as "Piglet", with singer JoJo finishing second as "Black Swan", and rapper Wiz Khalifa placing third as "Chameleon".

Panelists and hosts

Singer-songwriter Robin Thicke, television and radio personality Jenny McCarthy Wahlberg, actor and comedian Ken Jeong, and recording artist Nicole Scherzinger all returned for their fifth season as panelists. The panelists once again competed for "The Golden Ear", with Jenny McCarthy Wahlberg winning for the second time. Regular host Nick Cannon tested positive for COVID-19 a few days before production was set to begin in February 2021; consequently, Niecy Nash guest hosted the first five episodes. Cannon returned after competing as "the Bulldog" in the fifth episode.

Guest panelists included Joel McHale in the third episode, Rita Wilson in the seventh episode, Chrissy Metz in the eighth episode, Rob Riggle in the ninth episode, Darius Rucker in the tenth episode, and season four winner LeAnn Rimes in the eleventh episode.

Contestants
The season began with two groups of five, Group A and Group B. In a new twist, four wildcard contestants entered the competition beginning with the third episode, replacing previously eliminated contestants. The contestants among the season have a combined, "26 Grammy nominations, nine multi-platinum singles, four Oscar nominations, three Super Bowl appearances, six gold medals and two world records among them". In addition, the opening scene for the season premiere revealed that cast has, "a combined net worth over $600 million, eight marriages, 25 gold and platinum records, 459 tattoos, over 55 million records sold, over 198 million followers, three Grammy wins, three Emmy nominations, one Oscar win, nine divorces, and 146 toes."

This season featured a non-contestant masked character called "Cluedle-Doo". Over the course of 10 episodes, Cluedle-Doo periodically disrupted the broadcast to provide additional clues to the audience from his secret studio, teasing the host and panelists, while challenging the audience to discover who he was. In the semi-final episode, he appeared in person to perform "Return of the Mack" by Mark Morrison for the panel, then challenged them to guess his identity.  After the panelists made their guesses who he was, none of which was correct, he unmasked himself as singer Donnie Wahlberg, panelist Jenny McCarthy Wahlberg's husband, shocking McCarthy Wahlberg who did not recognize his voice.  

Kermit the Frog ("Snail") is the first fictional character to have competed on the American version of The Masked Singer and "Russian Dolls" (Hanson) are the second costume to feature more than one person (the first being Clint and Lisa Black's "Snow Owls" costume from the previous season) and the first costume to feature a group of different celebrities.

(WC) This masked singer is a wildcard contestant.

Episodes

Week 1 (March 10)

Week 2 (March 17)

Week 3 (March 24)

Week 4 (March 31)

Week 5 (April 7)

Week 6 (April 14)

Week 7 (April 21)

Week 8 (May 5)

Week 9 (May 12)

Week 10 (May 19)

Week 11 (May 26) – Finale
Group performance: "How Do I Live" by LeAnn Rimes

Ratings

Notes

References

2021 American television seasons
The Masked Singer (American TV series)